The 66th Filmfare Awards South ceremony honoring the winners and nominees of the best of South Indian cinema in 2018 is an event that was held on 21 December 2019 in Chennai. The nominations for all the main awards were announced on 13 December 2019. The Awards show was premiered on 26 January 2020 at 3 PM on Star Suvarna and Star Suvarna HD and also on Asianet and Asianet HD at 9 AM.

List of winners and nominees

Main awards

Kannada cinema

Malayalam cinema

Tamil cinema

Telugu cinema

Technical Awards

Special awards

Superlatives

Multiple nominations

Multiple wins

See also
 Filmfare Awards

References 

Filmfare Awards South
2019 Indian film awards